is a Japanese castle in the city of Okayama in Okayama Prefecture in Japan.  The main tower was completed in 1597, destroyed in 1945 and replicated in concrete in 1966.  Two of the watch towers survived the bombing of 1945 and are now listed by the national Agency for Cultural Affairs as Important Cultural Properties.

In stark contrast to the white "Egret Castle" of neighboring Himeji, Okayama Castle has a black exterior, earning it the nickname  or "castle of the black bird". (The black castle of Matsumoto in Nagano is also known as "Crow Castle", but it is karasu-jō in Japanese.)

Today, only a few parts of Okayama Castle's roof (including the fish-shaped-gargoyles) are gilded, but prior to the Battle of Sekigahara the main keep also featured gilded roof tiles, earning it the nickname .

History
In 1570, Ukita Naoie killed castle lord Kanemitsu Munetaka and started remodeling the castle and completed by his son Hideie in 1597.  Three years later, Hideie sided with the ill-fated Toyotomi Clan at the Battle of Sekigahara, was captured by the Tokugawa Clan and exiled to the island prison of Hachijo.  The castle and surrounding fiefdoms were given to Kobayakawa Hideaki as spoils of war. Kobayakawa died just two years later without leaving an heir, and the castle (and fiefdom) was given to the Ikeda Clan, who later added Kōraku-en as a private garden.

In 1869 the castle became the property of the Meiji government's Hyōbu-shō (Ministry of War), who saw the 'samurai' era castles as archaic and unnecessary.   Like many other castles throughout Japan, the outer moats were filled in and the old castle walls gradually disappeared underneath the city.  On June 29, 1945, allied bombers burnt the castle to the ground.  Reconstruction work began in 1964 and was completed in 1966.  In 1996 the rooftop gargoyles were gilded as part of the 400th anniversary celebrations.

The reconstructed castle is a concrete building complete with air-conditioning, elevators and numerous displays documenting the castle's history (with a heavy focus on the Ikeda era.)  Little information is available in English.  Access to the inner sanctuary is free.

Gallery

See also
Okayama Kōraku Gardens
Inryoji Temple

References

Further reading

External links 

 Okayama Castle Guide homepage (in English)

Castles in Okayama Prefecture
Okayama
Museums in Okayama Prefecture
History museums in Japan
Houses completed in 1597
Historic Sites of Japan
Important Cultural Properties of Japan
Buildings and structures in Japan destroyed during World War II
Ikeda clan
Kobayakawa clan
Ukita clan